Perry Wilson Jenkins (April 5, 1867 – June 19, 1955) was an American football player and coach, college president, and state senator. He served as the head football coach at Simpson College in Indianola, Iowa in 1895, compiling a record of 1–1–1. Prior to that, Jenkins was a started quarterback at Miami University in Oxford, Ohio.

Jenkins served as the president of Amity College in College Springs, Iowa in the mid-1890s. He later served as the President of the Wyoming State Senate in 1927. He is nicknamed "The Father of Sublette County, Wyoming".

Head coaching record

References

External links
 

1867 births
1955 deaths
19th-century players of American football
American football quarterbacks
Heads of universities and colleges in the United States
Miami RedHawks football players
Presidents of the Wyoming Senate
Republican Party Wyoming state senators
Simpson Storm football coaches
People from Franklin County, Indiana
Players of American football from Indiana